Tali Shahi-ye Olya (also Romanized as Tālī Shāhī-ye ‘Olyā; also known as Tālī Shāhī) is a village in Sepidar Rural District, in the Central District of Boyer-Ahmad County, Kohgiluyeh and Boyer-Ahmad Province, Iran. At the 2006 census, its population was 16, in 6 families.

References 

Populated places in Boyer-Ahmad County